Curt Rottman (February 13, 1886, in Dresden – January 13, 1928, in New York City) was an American gymnast who competed in the 1924 Summer Olympics.

References

1886 births
1928 deaths
American male artistic gymnasts
Olympic gymnasts of the United States
Gymnasts at the 1924 Summer Olympics
German emigrants to the United States
Sportspeople from Dresden